Psyllotoxus is a genus of longhorn beetles of the subfamily Lamiinae, containing the following species:

 Psyllotoxus griseocinctus Thomson, 1868
 Psyllotoxus inexpectatus Martins & Galileo, 1990

References

Onciderini